Bruno Bianchi (born 8 February 1939) is an Italian former sprinter, mainly specialized in 400 metres, who won two medals with the national relay team at the International athletics competitions.

Biography
Bruno Bianchi participated at one edition of the Summer Olympics (1964), he has 26 caps in national team from 1961 to 1971.

Achievements

National titles
Bruno Bianchi has won 3 times the individual national championship.
1 win in 400 metres (1964)
2 wins in 400 metres indoor (1970, 1971)

See also
Italy national relay team

References

External links
 

1939 births
Living people
Sportspeople from Genoa
Italian male sprinters
Olympic athletes of Italy
Athletes (track and field) at the 1964 Summer Olympics
Universiade medalists in athletics (track and field)
Universiade gold medalists for Italy
Athletics competitors of Fiamme Oro
Italian Athletics Championships winners
Medalists at the 1965 Summer Universiade